The 19th Annual Black Reel Awards ceremony, presented by the Foundation for the Augmentation of African-Americans in Film (FAAAF) and honoring the best films of 2018, took place on February 7, 2019, at 8:00 p.m. EST (5:00 p.m. PST).  During the ceremony, FAAAF presented the  Black Reel Awards in 23 categories.

Black Panther (film) lead the nominations with a record-breaking 18 nominations followed by If Beale Street Could Talk and BlacKkKlansman with 14 and 11 nominations respectively.

This marks the first year that Outstanding achievements in Costume Design, Cinematography and Production Design were recognized by the voting academy.

The 3rd Annual Black Reel Awards for Television was presented by the Foundation for the Augmentation of African-Americans in Film (FAAAF) and honoring the best in television from June 1, 2018 - May 31, 2019, took place on August 1, 2019 at 8:00 p.m. EST (5:00 p.m. PST).

When They See Us lead the nominations with a record-breaking 17 nominations including Outstanding TV Movie or Limited Series. The limited series went on to win 7 awards including Outstanding TV Movie or Limited Series. HBO's Insecure and NBC's This Is Us took home the awards for Outstanding Comedy and Drama Series respectively.

Black Reel Awards Film Winners and nominees
Winners are highlighted in bold.

Summary of Film Awards and Nominations
List of films with multiple nominations

Black Reel Awards for Television Winners and nominees
Winners are highlighted in bold.

Summary of Television Awards and Nominations

Series with multiple nominations

References

Black Reel Awards
2018 film awards
2018 in American cinema
2018 awards in the United States